Djibrosso (also spelled Djiboroso) is a town in north-western Ivory Coast. It is a sub-prefecture and commune of Kani Department in Worodougou Region, Woroba District.
In 2014, the population of the sub-prefecture of Djibrosso was 11,859.

Villages
The twelve villages of the sub-prefecture of Djibrosso and their population in 2014 are:

Notes

Sub-prefectures of Worodougou
Communes of Worodougou